Up There is a 2011 British feature film comedy-drama, written and directed by Zam Salim and starring Burn Gorman, Kate O'Flynn, Aymen Hamdouchi, Chris Waitt, Jo Hartley and Warren Brown. It is financed by the UK Film Council, BBC and Creative Scotland. It is based on Salim's short film "Laid Off". The film had its world premiere at the International Film Festival of Mannheim-Heidelberg on 18 November 2011. It won the award for Best Feature Film at the 2012 British Academy Scotland Awards, and was broadcast on BBC Two in August 2015.

Cast 
 Burn Gorman
 Kate O'Flynn
 Aymen Hamdouchi
 Kulvinder Ghir
 Farren Morgan
 Jo Hartley

References

External links 
 
 

2011 films
2011 comedy-drama films
2010s fantasy comedy films
British comedy-drama films
British fantasy films
Films about the afterlife
Features based on short films
2010s English-language films
2010s British films
Scottish films
Films set in Scotland